"Bufo" scorteccii, formerly known as Duttaphrynus scorteccii, is a species of toad in the family Bufonidae. It is endemic to Yemen, with its range restricted to a plateau near the western region of Mafhaq. Its natural habitats are shrubland as well as wetland areas.

References

scorteccii}
Endemic fauna of Yemen
Taxonomy articles created by Polbot
Amphibians described in 1970
Southwestern Arabian foothills savanna
Taxobox binomials not recognized by IUCN